Michael Sacher (born 1 September 1964) is a German politician from Alliance 90/The Greens.

Early life 
Sacher was born in Dortmund and worked as a bookseller before entering politics.

Political career 
In the 2021 German federal election, he contested Unna I but was not elected. In 2022, he entered the Bundestag, taking the seat of Oliver Krischer who resigned to join the Second Wüst cabinet.

References

See also 

 List of members of the 20th Bundestag

Living people
1964 births
Politicians from Dortmund
People from Unna (district)
Members of the Bundestag 2021–2025
Members of the Bundestag for Alliance 90/The Greens

German booksellers
Members of the Bundestag for North Rhine-Westphalia